Saint Pachomius the Great (ca. 292 – 348), also known as Abba Pachomius and Pakhom is the founder of Christian cenobitic monasticism.

Pachomius may also refer to:

People
 Pachomius the Serb (Пахомий Серб, also known as Pachomius Logothete), fifteenth century hagiographer in the employ of the Russian Orthodox Church
 Patriarch Pachomius I of Constantinople, reigned 1503-1504 and 1504-1513
 Patriarch Pachomius II of Constantinople, reigned 1584-1585
 Hieromonk Pahomije, 16th century Serbian printer
 Metropolitan Pachomius of Behira, also known as "Anba Pachomius", a Coptic Christian Bishop

Other
 Pachomius (spider), a genus of jumping spiders

See also
 Pacôme, French name
 Pakhomov, Russian name

Pachomius